This is a list of former administrative divisions in the ceremonial county of Cornwall, England, United Kingdom.

Former District Councils

 Caradon
 Carrick
 Kerrier
 North Cornwall
 Penwith
 Restormel

Former urban/rural districts and municipal boroughs
Municipal boroughs existed from 1835 and urban and rural districts existed from 1894 as the middle level of local government. Urban and rural districts were created through the Local Government Act 1894 to provide administration as a subdivision of administrative counties; civil parishes within the districts formed the lowest level of local government. Elected municipal boroughs were created under the Municipal Corporations Act 1835, but had their roots from mediaeval times, established as municipal corporations.

These were all abolished in 1974 under the Local Government Act 1972, to form the new non-metropolitan districts, six in Cornwall. Although districts and boroughs were created and abolished between these periods, as well as undergoing boundary changes after various reviews. This is a list of all the districts and boroughs that existed between these times.

See also

 List of civil parishes in Cornwall (pre-2009)
 Hundreds of Cornwall

References

Former administrative divisions
Former administrative divisions
Former administrative divisions
Cornwall